The British Academy Video Games Award for Original Property is an award presented annually by the British Academy of Film and Television Arts (BAFTA). It is given in honor to "the best game which is not part of an established series and represents a new intellectual property".

The award was first presented at the 2nd British Academy Games Awards as Originality, after which the category was discontinued. It was revived in 2015 at the 11th edition, when it was presented as Original Property. To date, no developer has won this award more that once. Nintendo EAD are the only developers with two nominations in the category and therefore have the most nominations without a win. Among publishers, Sony Interactive Entertainment has a leading eight nominations and two wins, tied with Annapurna Interactive for most wins. Devolver Digital has the most nominations without a win, with five. 

The current holder of the award is It Takes Two, writers of Unpacking by Hazelight Studios and Electronic Arts, which won at the 18th British Academy Games Awards in 2022.

Winners and nominees
In the following table, the years are listed as per BAFTA convention, and generally correspond to the year of game release in the United Kingdom.

Originality

Original Property

Multiple nominations and wins

Developers

Publishers

References

External links
 Official website

Original Property